Myles David Jack (born September 3, 1995) is an American football  linebacker who is a free agent. He played college football at UCLA and was named the top freshman player in the Pac-12, receiving honors both on defense as well as on offense for his work as a running back and was named an All-Pac-12 linebacker twice. In 2015, Jack dropped out of UCLA and declared for the draft after suffering a season-ending knee injury. Jack was selected by the Jacksonville Jaguars in the second round of the 2016 NFL Draft.

Early years
Jack was born in Scottsdale, Arizona, to La Sonjia and H. David Jack. While in high school, he lettered in football and track at Bellevue High in Bellevue, Washington. In football, Jack played exclusively as a running back through his sophomore year, before also becoming a linebacker. As a senior, he had 98 tackles and 24 sacks, leading his team to a 14–0 record.

On the track team, Jack earned a fourth-place finish in the 400-meter dash at the 2013 WA 3A State Meet, recording a personal best time of 49.05 seconds. At the 2013 3A KingCo Championships, he took bronze in the 200-meter dash event by clocking a personal-best time of 22.12 seconds. He was also a member of the 2013 state 3A champion 4 × 100 m (41.64) and 4 × 400 m (3:20.12) relay teams.

Considered a four-star recruit by Rivals.com, Jack was listed as the No. 16 outside linebacker in the nation in 2013. He chose UCLA over offers from Florida State, Arizona State, Stanford, Washington, and Utah.

College career
As a true freshman in 2013, Jack played in 13 games, starting 12 at linebacker and one at running back. He finished the season with 75 tackles, the second-most ever by a UCLA true freshman behind Kenny Easley's 93 in 1977. Jack also added two interceptions and one touchdown on defense.  As a running back, he had 267 rushing yards on 38 carries, averaging over seven yards per carry, and ran for a team-leading seven touchdowns in five games on offense.

Jack did not play at running back until the ninth game of the season in a 31–26 win over Arizona, when he gained 120 yards on six carries, including a 66-yard touchdown. The Bruins had been short on running backs with starter Jordon James out with an ankle injury. With more injuries to their backs the following week, Jack ran for a UCLA freshman-record four touchdowns in a 41–31 win over Washington. With the offense still depleted in the backfield and with Coach Jim Mora playing mostly a nickel defense against Arizona State, Jack started and played exclusively at running back against the Sun Devils, carrying 16 times for 86 yards and a touchdown in a 38–33 loss. For his play, Jack was named both the Pac-12 Conference Offensive and Defensive Freshman Player of the Year. He was also named an All-American by Athlon Sports and was a finalist for the Paul Hornung Award. He also earned Freshman All-American honors by The Sporting News in 2013.

In his sophomore year in 2014, he was named to the All-Pac-12 second-team as a linebacker for the second straight year. He also continued to see time as a running back, carrying the ball 28 times in nine games.

On September 22, 2015, during a routine practice, Jack tore the meniscus in his knee while performing a non-contact drill, and a statement was released from coaches stating that he would not return for the remainder of the season. On October 6, head coach Jim Mora announced that Jack had withdrawn from UCLA to focus on his rehabilitilation and entering the 2016 NFL draft. His injury had occurred two days before the start of the fall quarter, and he had already fallen behind in his classes while rehabbing from his knee and coping with his short-term immobility. Entering the 2015 season, Jack was widely considered a first-round draft prospect.

Professional career
Jack was one of 39 linebackers to attend the NFL Scouting Combine in Indianapolis, Indiana. He was limited to the bench press due to his knee and finished tied for 13th in the bench press among all participating linebackers. On March 10, 2016, Jack attended UCLA's pro day and performed the vertical jump, broad jump, and positional drills. His vertical jump would have finished eighth among all linebackers at the combine and his broad jump would have finished fourth. Team representatives and scouts from all 32 teams attended to scout Jack and meet with him, including head coach Hue Jackson (Browns) and general managers Doug Whaley (Bills) and Les Snead (Rams). Throughout the draft process, Jack attended private visits and workouts with multiple NFL teams, including the Jacksonville Jaguars, Miami Dolphins, Chicago Bears, New Orleans Saints, San Francisco 49ers, Atlanta Falcons, and Oakland Raiders. 

On April 14, 2016, he returned to Indianapolis to undergo another physical to check on his knee and evaluate his recovery progress. Prior to the draft, Jack was confident he could play immediately, but admitted that his knee had degenerative aspects which could require microfracture surgery in the future. At the conclusion of the pre-draft process, Jack was projected to be an early first round pick by NFL draft experts and scouts was expected to be a top ten pick. He was ranked the top linebacker prospect in the draft by Sports Illustrated, ESPN, and NFL analysts Charles Davis, Mike Mayock, Lance Zierlein, and Daniel Jeremiah. Jack was also ranked the top overall player in the draft by ESPN, the second best overall player by NFL analysts Daniel Jeremiah and Lance Zierlein, and the third best overall player by NFL analyst Charles Davis.

Jacksonville Jaguars

2016
The Jacksonville Jaguars selected Jack in the second round with the 36th overall pick in the 2016 NFL Draft. The Jaguars traded their second (38th overall) and fifth round (146th overall) picks in the 2016 NFL Draft to the Baltimore Ravens in order to move up two spots to 36th overall and draft Myles Jack. His fall out of the first round was widely attributed to concerns over his knee. Jack was the fifth linebacker selected in 2016.

On May 13, 2016, the Jacksonville Jaguars signed Jack to a four-year, $6.33 million contract that includes $3.54 million guaranteed and a signing bonus of $2.80 million.

Throughout training camp, he competed against veteran Dan Skuta to be the starting strongside linebacker and also took reps at middle linebacker. He learned the middle linebacker position as the Jaguars drafted him with the intentions of him eventually taking over for Paul Posluszny. Head coach Gus Bradley named Jack the backup outside linebacker behind veterans Dan Skuta and Telvin Smith to begin the regular season.

He made his professional regular season debut in the Jacksonville Jaguars' season-opening 27–23 loss to the Green Bay Packers. The following week, Jack recorded his first solo tackle on Chargers' running back Melvin Gordon after Gordon caught an 11-yard pass by Philip Rivers. After tackling Gordon again on the following play, Jack finished the Jaguars' 38–14 loss at the San Diego Chargers with two solo tackles. On October 2, 2016, Jack earned his first career start at strongside linebacker after Dan Skuta was unable to play after suffering a hip injury the previous week. He finished the 30–27 victory over the Indianapolis Colts with four combined tackles and a pass deflection. In Week 12, Jack recorded a season-high five combined tackles and recorded his first career sack with teammate Tyson Alualu on quarterback Tyrod Taylor during the Jaguars' 28–21 loss to the Buffalo Bills. Head coach Gus Bradley was fired after their Week 15 loss to the Houston Texans due a nine-game losing streak and a 2–12 record. Assistant head coach/offensive line coach Doug Marrone was named interim head coach for the last two games of the season. Jack finished his rookie season in 2016 with 24 combined tackles (18 solo), two pass deflections, and was credited with half a sack in 16 games and ten starts.

2017
On January 9, 2017, interim head coach Doug Marrone was elevated to full-time head coach and opted to retain Todd Wash as the Jaguars' defensive coordinator. On April 18, 2017, it was announced by the Jaguars' coaching staff that Myles Jack would enter organized team activities as the starting middle linebacker and Paul Posluszny would take over the starting strongside linebacker role previously held by Jack and the recently departed Dan Skuta. Throughout training camp, Jack made the transition to middle linebacker with the assistance of teammate Paul Posluszny. Jack reverted to his strongside linebacker position after he struggled to adjust to his new role and had difficulty performing the required duties during the Jaguars' first preseason game against the New England Patriots. Head coach Doug Marrone named Jack the starting strongside linebacker, Telvin Smith the starting weakside linebacker, and Paul Posluszny the starting middle linebacker to start the regular season.

He started the Jacksonville Jaguars' season-opener at the Houston Texans and recorded a season-high 14 combined tackles (eight solo) during their 29–7 victory. The following game, Jack made six combined tackles and had his first career solo sack on Titans' quarterback Marcus Mariota in the Jaguars' 37–16 loss to the Tennessee Titans. In Week 7, he collected eight combined tackles, broke up a pass, and sacked Jacoby Brissett as the Jaguars' routed the Indianapolis Colts 27–0. He finished his second season with 90 combined tackles (66 solo), three pass deflections, and two sacks in 16 games and 16 starts. His 90 tackles finished second on the team, behind only Telvin Smith who had 102 combined tackles.

The Jaguars finished first in the AFC South with a 10–6 record in their first season under head coach Doug Marrone. On January 7, 2018, Jack started his first career playoff game and recorded six combined tackles, two pass deflections, and a sack in a 10–3 victory over the Buffalo Bills in the AFC Wildcard game. The following week, he made six combined tackles, deflected a pass, and an interception during a 45–42 win at the Pittsburgh Steelers in the AFC Divisional round. On January 21, 2018, he collected seven combined tackles during the Jaguars' 24–20 loss at the New England Patriots in the AFC Championship. He was a part of a controversial play in the fourth quarter that occurred after he forced a fumble by Patriots' running back Dion Lewis and recovered it. Jack was returning it for a defensive touchdown that would have put the Jaguars' up 26–10 against the Patriots, but had the play blown dead by the referees who had seen Jack was down after recovering the fumble.

2018
In the Jaguars' 2018 season opener against the New York Giants, Jack recorded a 32-yard pick six off of Eli Manning in the 20–15 victory. In the 2018 season, Jack started all 16 games and recorded 2.5 sacks, 107 total tackles, four quarterback hits, one interception, one pass defensed, one forced fumble, and one fumble recovery.

2019

On August 31, 2019, Jack signed a four-year, $57 million contract extension with $33 million guaranteed. During Week 1 against the Kansas City Chiefs, Jack was disqualified for throwing a punch at Demarcus Robinson. He was placed on injured reserve on December 5, 2019 with a knee injury. He finished the season with 66 tackles, four passes defensed, 0.5 sacks, and an interception through 11 games and 11 starts.

2020
In Week 1 against the Indianapolis Colts, Jack recorded 11 tackles and his first sack of the season on Philip Rivers during the 27–20 win.

On March 15, 2022, Jack was released by the Jaguars. He was the last of the Sacksonville Defense left on the Jacksonville Jaguars.

Pittsburgh Steelers
On March 17, 2022, Jack signed a two-year contract with the Pittsburgh Steelers.

Jack was released from the Steelers on March 16, 2023.

References

External links
Jacksonville Jaguars bio
UCLA Bruins bio

1995 births
Living people
Players of American football from Scottsdale, Arizona
American football linebackers
American football running backs
UCLA Bruins football players
Jacksonville Jaguars players
Pittsburgh Steelers players